Phyllonorycter adderis is a moth of the family Gracillariidae. It is found in south-western Rwanda in montane, closed canopy forests at an altitude of about 1,800 metres.

The length of the forewings is 2.85–2.96 mm. The forewing  ground colour is ochreous with white markings. The hindwings are dark grey with a long fringe of the same shading as the hindwing. Adults are on wing in August.

The larvae feed as leaf miners on Urena lobata.  The mine has the form of a semi-transparent tentiform mine which is made on the underside of the leaf. Several mines can be present on a single leaf.

Etymology
The specific epithet is derived from Latin addere (meaning to append) and refers to the long appendical cucullus on the valve.

References

Moths described in 2012
adderis
Moths of Africa

Leaf miners
Taxa named by Jurate de Prins
Lepidoptera of Rwanda